Euseius dowdi is a species of mite in the family Phytoseiidae.

References

dowdi
Articles created by Qbugbot
Animals described in 1993